Guldasta is a 2020 Indian Bengali-language drama film directed by Arjunn Dutta, starring Arpita Chatterjee, Swastika Mukherjee, Debjani Chattopadhyay and Anubhav Kanjilal. The film was released on 21 October 2020, in theaters coinciding with Puja holiday.

Plot
Guldasta  is a women-centric film, and interweaves tales of three lead female characters. Srirupa, Renu and Dolly constitute the trio whose journey of life is depicted in Guldasta. The backbone of the story stands strong with the realities of life faced by these three women who has a surprisingly unique world of make-believe emotions of their own. Be prepared to let the story touch your soul.

Cast
 Arpita Chatterjee as Srirupa Sengupta
 Swastika Mukherjee as Dolly Bagri
 Debjani Chattopadhyay as Renu
 Anubhav Kanjilal as Tukai, Renu's Son
 Anuradha Mukherjee as Riya
 Ishaan Mazumder as Arnab Sengupta, Srirupa's Husband
 Chhanda Karanji Chattopadhyay as Renu's Mother In Law
 Mayukh Ray as Rohit
 Abhijit Guha – Special appearance as Renu's Husband

Soundtrack

The soundtrack and lyrics of the film are composed by Soumya Rit.

Reception
Guldasta received mediocre ratings from critics. Shantanu Ray Chaudhury, reviewing Guldasta, noted that despite its shortcomings, the film manages to appeal to the audience's emotion because of the director's  "feel for the minutiae of life".

References

External links
 

2020 films
2020 drama films
Bengali-language Indian films
2020s Bengali-language films
Indian drama films
Films directed by Arjunn Dutta